Shawn Faria (born June 28, 1978) is a Canadian former soccer player who played the majority of his career with the Toronto Lynx in the USL First Division and had several stints with various clubs in the Canadian Soccer League.

Playing career
Faria began playing soccer at the youth level with the University of Louisville from 1997 till 1999. In 1999, Faria signed his first professional contract with Toronto Croatia of the Canadian Professional Soccer League. He made his debut for the club on June 7, 1999 against St. Catharines Wolves in a 2-0 victory. He would return to professional soccer in 2002 to sign with the Toronto Lynx in the USL A-League. He scored his first professional goal July 30, 2002 against the Calgary Storm.

After the 2002 A-League season came to a conclusion he was loaned to the Mississauga Olympians in the CPSL. He made his debut on September 11, 2002 in an Open Canada Cup match against the Toronto Croatia where he scored a goal in a 1-1 draw.  He helped the Olympians secure a playoff berth by finishing second in the Western Conference, but unfortunately were defeated by the North York Astros in a wild card match.

Faria was re-signed by the Lynx for the 2003 season on March 18, 2003. On April 7, 2004 his signing was announced in a press conference where he was also appointed the new team captain succeeding Theo Zagar, who was transferred to rivals Rochester Rhinos. He missed most of the season due to a leg injury, but returned to play in 18 matches and score 2 goals. Due to injuries he was released from his contract on June 7, 2005, in order to make room on the roster for new signings. Faria was signed by the expansion franchise Oakville Blue Devils of the Canadian Soccer League, where he helped the Blue Devils reach the playoffs.

In the Western Conference semi-final on October 5, 2005, he scored the opening goal for the Blue Devils, which would result in a 3-2 victory over the Windsor Border Stars. He helped lead Oakville to the CPSL Championship final, where they defeated Vaughan Shooters to a score of 2–1. On August 1, 2006 the Toronto Lynx announced the return of Faria. He helped the Lynx to a 10-game undefeated streak at home, and also reached the finals of the Open Canada Cup, but he did not feature in the match where the Lynx finished runners up to Ottawa St. Anthony Italia losing 2–0. After the 2006 season, the Lynx franchise dropped two divisions down to the PDL, which resulted in the Lynx to release most of their senior players from their contracts. He is now a teacher at St. Rock Secondary School in Brampton, Ontario. Shawn is also a part time coach for the 2007 North Miss Soccer Club OPDL youth team.

Managerial career
Since retiring from soccer Faria is currently the Director of Female Program and Showcase Team for the Winstars Soccer Academy. Faria coached from 2006 until 2010 the Golden Eagles A team U-14 of the Erin Mills SC.

References

External links
Winstars Soccer Academy profile
University of Louisville profile

Living people
1978 births
Soccer players from Mississauga
Canadian soccer players
Association football midfielders
Louisville Cardinals men's soccer players
Toronto Croatia players
Toronto Lynx players
Toronto (Mississauga) Olympians players
Brampton United players
Canadian Soccer League (1998–present) players
A-League (1995–2004) players
Canadian people of Portuguese descent